Yongping County is a county of the Dali Bai Autonomous Prefecture, located in the west of Yunnan Province, China.

Administrative divisions
Yongping County has 3 towns, 1 township and 3 ethnic townships. 
3 towns
 Bonan
 Shanyang
 Longjie
1 township
 Longmen
3 ethnic townships
 Beidou Yi
 Changjie Yi
 Shuixie Yi

Climate

References

External links
 Yongping County Official Website

County-level divisions of Dali Bai Autonomous Prefecture